Jean-Luc Déjean (10 May 1921, Montpellier – 12 September 2006) was a French professor of classical literature, a producer of television programs (documentaries and youth programs) and writer.

Works  
Novels

Biographies
 Clément Marot
 Marguerite de Navarre
 Les comtes de Toulouse (1050–1250)

Essais
 Le théâtre français d'aujourd'hui (1945–1974)
 Le théâtre français d'aujourd'hui (1945–1985)

Poetry
 La Feuille à l'envers

External links 
 Jean-Luc Déjean on Fayard editor
 Jean-Luc Déjean on Ricochet-jeunes.org
 Le Maître des chiens by Jean-Luc Déjean on Decitre.fr

1921 births
Writers from Montpellier
2006 deaths
French children's writers
French biographers
20th-century French essayists
French television producers
Prix Fénéon winners
Mass media people from Montpellier